This is a list of defunct airlines from Paraguay.

See also
List of airlines of Paraguay
List of airports in Paraguay

References

Airlines, defunct
Paraguay
Airlines
Airlines